Abohar-Jodhpur-Bathinda Express is an express train from the Indian Railways connecting Abohar Junction in Punjab to Jodhpur Junction of Rajasthan. While returning from Jodhpur Junction the train terminates to Bathinda Junction. It is currently being operated with 14721/14722 train numbers on a daily basis.

Service
The 14721 JodhpurJunction-Bathinda Junction Express has an average speed of 42 km/hr and covers 600 km in 14 hours 10 minutes. The 14722 Abohar Junction-Jodhpur Junction Passenger has an average speed of 45 km/hr and 673 km in 15 hours.

Route and halts

Coach composition
The train consists of 10 coaches:

 1 Sleeper Coach
 7 General Coaches
 2 Second-class Luggage/parcel vans

Traction
Both trains are hauled by an Abu Road-based WDM-3A locomotive from Abohar Junction to Jodhpur Junction and Jodhpur Junction to Bathinda Junction.

Notes

References

External links 
 54703/Abohar - Jodhpur Passenger
 54704/Jodhpur Bhatinda Passenger

Rail transport in Haryana
Rail transport in Rajasthan
Transport in Jodhpur
Transport in Bathinda
Slow and fast passenger trains in India